Niederalpl Pass (el. 1221 m.) is a high mountain pass in the Austrian Alps in the Bundesland of Styria.

It is traversed by State Highway 113 with a maximum grade of 10 percent. It connects Wegscheid and Mürzsteg. At the pass, there are two restaurants and several ski lifts. Neighboring peaks are the Hohe Veitsch and the Tonion.

See also
 List of highest paved roads in Europe
 List of mountain passes

Mountain passes of the Alps
Mountain passes of Styria
Mürzsteg Alps